Robert Dołęga (born December 31, 1977, in Łuków) is a Polish weightlifter. He won a silver medal for the heavyweight division at the 2000 European Weightlifting Championships in Sofia, Bulgaria, and bronze at the 2008 European Weightlifting Championships in Lignano Sabbiadoro, Italy.

Dołęga competed in the men's heavyweight class (105 kg) at the 2004 Summer Olympics in Athens. He did not finish the event, after failing to lift a snatch of 180 kg in three attempts.

At the 2008 Summer Olympics in Beijing, Dołęga competed for his second time in the men's 105 kg class, along with his younger brother Marcin. Unlike his previous Olympics, he placed eighth in this event, as he successfully lifted 184 kg in the snatch, and hoisted 221 kg in the clean and jerk, for a total of 405 kg.

References

External links
NBC 2008 Olympics profile

Polish male weightlifters
1977 births
Living people
Olympic weightlifters of Poland
Weightlifters at the 2004 Summer Olympics
Weightlifters at the 2008 Summer Olympics
People from Łuków
Sportspeople from Lublin Voivodeship
European Weightlifting Championships medalists
21st-century Polish people
20th-century Polish people